Carey Schueler (born  1974) is the daughter of former Chicago White Sox General Manager Ron Schueler. She was the first woman ever drafted by a Major League Baseball team when the White Sox picked the 18-year-old left-handed pitcher in the 43rd round (1208th pick overall) of the 1993 MLB draft.

Up until that time she had been a basketball star at Campolindo High School in Moraga, California. She attended and played basketball for DePaul University in Chicago, Illinois before transferring to St. Mary's College of California, back in Moraga, where she continued to play until an injury in 1996.

In 2002, Schueler was rumored to be a contestant for Survivor: Thailand. Despite the rumors, she never appeared on the show.

See also
 Women in baseball

References

External links

1970s births
American women's basketball players
DePaul Blue Demons women's basketball players
American female baseball players
Living people
Year of birth missing (living people)
Saint Mary's Gaels women's basketball players